Chengkung Airfield (呈贡机场) is a former World War II United States Army Air Forces airfield in Chenggong County, Yunnan, Republic of China, at in the suburb of Kunming. After its demolished during the PRC era, its current site is Chenggung New District No. 1 Elementary School (呈贡新区第一小学).

History

WWII
Construction of the airfield began in November 1942, with the airfield opening on 27 January 1943. Chengkung was a major terminal for "the Hump" trans-Himalayan transport aircraft between India and China for Tenth Air Force and Air Transport Command C-47 Skytrain and C-46 Commando aircraft. In addition, Air Technical Service Command maintained a maintenance and supply facility at the base to support the airlift operations over the Himalayas.

In addition to the transport mission,  Chengkung was used by the 374th and 375th Bombardment Squadrons, flying B-24 Liberator heavy bombers from the field beginning in March 1943. The 23rd Fighter Group and 76th Fighter Squadron staged P-51 Mustang fighters from the field beginning in October 1943. Also the 16th Fighter Squadron, with P-40 Warhawks arrived in October. Photo-reconnaissance aircraft used Chengkung throughout the war, flying combat intelligence missions over Japanese-held territory until 30 September 1945 when operations ceased and the facility was closed.

Agricultural use
Later, under the PRC era, the airfield has been dismantled, the land being used for agriculture. The only remnants of the base are parts of the main runway, which can be discerned in aerial photography. Taxiways and dispersals are largely removed, although some remain as single-lane roads connecting agricultural fields.

Current site: School
Its current site is Chenggung New District No. 1 Elementary School (呈贡新区第一小学). On 12 June 2017, the school held a ceremony to endorse "Kunming Flying Tigers Elementary School" as its official nickname. The ceremony was attended by Raymond Greene, the Consulate General of the United States at Chengdu. The nickname is presented by the Yunnan Flying Tigers Research Institute (云南省飞虎队研究会).

See also 

 Kunming Wujiaba International Airport

References

 Maurer, Maurer. Air Force Combat Units Of World War II. Maxwell Air Force Base, Alabama: Office of Air Force History, 1983. 
 Airfields & Seaplane Anchorages China
 USAFHRA search Chengkung

External links

Airfields of the United States Army Air Forces in China
Airports in Yunnan
Airports established in 1943
Transport in Kunming